The First Temptation of Christ is a 2019 Brazilian satirical comedy film produced by the comedy troupe Porta dos Fundos. It was released on Netflix on 3 December 2019.

Plot
Jesus returns home after 40 days in the desert, where a surprise 30th birthday party awaits him. At the party, Mary and Joseph reveal to Jesus that his true father is God.

Cast

Reception
The Christmas special has faced backlash over its satirical depictions, which imply Jesus has a gay lover and Mary smokes marijuana. Over 2 million people have petitioned online for the show's removal and advocated boycotts of Netflix over "blasphemy"; the creators maintain the protests are homophobic.

On 24 December 2019, the headquarters of Porta dos Fundos in Rio de Janeiro was bombed with two Molotov cocktails. A Brazilian Integralist religious extremist group calling themselves the "Popular Nationalist Insurgency Command of the Large Brazilian Integralist Family" claimed responsibility for the bombing, even filming themselves attacking the offices while wearing ski masks; the group also criticized Netflix and labeled The First Temptation of Christ as blasphemous.

In January 2020, Dias Toffoli, the president of the Supreme Federal Court of Brazil, intervened on the attempted censorship of the film, overruling a judge from the Rio de Janeiro Court of Justice who ordered the film's withdrawal from the streaming platform.

See also
 The Last Hangover (2018)

References

External links
 
 

2019 films
2019 comedy films
2019 controversies
2019 LGBT-related films
2010s Portuguese-language films
2010s satirical films
Brazilian comedy films
Brazilian LGBT-related films
Brazilian satirical films
Christianity in popular culture controversies
Films about birthdays
Films about LGBT and Christianity
Films based on the Bible
Films critical of Christianity and Christians
LGBT-related comedy films
LGBT-related controversies in film
LGBT-related satirical films
Netflix specials
Obscenity controversies in film
Portrayals of Jesus in film
Portrayals of Saint Joseph in film
Portrayals of the Virgin Mary in film
Religious controversies in film
Religious satire films